HNLMS Rotterdam may refer to following ships of the Royal Netherlands Navy:

 , a 
 , a Landing Platform Dock

Royal Netherlands Navy ship names